Eupatorium variabile is a plant species in the family Asteraceae.

References

variabile
Plants described in 1910